Dale Township is a township in O'Brien County, Iowa, USA.

History
Dale Township was founded in 1880.

References

O'Brien County, Iowa
Townships in Iowa